The 1963 Australian Grand Prix was a motor race held at Warwick Farm Raceway in New South Wales, Australia on 10 February 1963. Open to Formula Libre cars, it was the opening heat of the 1963 Australian Drivers' Championship. The race, which was the twenty eighth Australian Grand Prix, had 16 starters.

The race featured a strong representation of international competitors, with entries from Ecurie Vitesse for Jack Brabham, Bruce McLaren for himself, R.R.C. Walker Racing Team for Graham Hill and from the Bowmaker Racing Team for John Surtees, Tony Maggs and Jim Palmer. Jack Brabham won the race, his second Australian Grand Prix victory, after a battle with John Surtees. It was the first AGP victory by a driver in a self-developed car since Doug Whiteford won in his "Black Bess" Ford V8 Special in 1950.

Stirling Moss, who was recovering from a near-fatal crash at the Goodwood Circuit, was the special guest at the Grand Prix. Moss, who had driven a Maserati 250F to victory in the 1956 Australian Grand Prix at the Albert Park Grand Prix Circuit in Melbourne, also provided guest commentary for Australian television station the ABC alongside Doug Woodward, Bill Reynolds and pit reporter Norman May.

Classification 
Results as follows.

Notes 
 Pole position: Bruce McLaren - 1'38.8
 Fastest lap: John Surtees and Jack Brabham - 1'40.2 (80.84 m.p.h.) (130.074 k.p.h.)
 Winner's average speed: 79.57 m.p.h. (128.05 k.p.h)

References

Grand Prix
Australian Grand Prix
Motorsport at Warwick Farm
Australian Grand Prix